The Beatles Complete On Ukulele was a music project by David Barratt that incorporates re-recording and re-creating all original songs The Beatles ever recorded, with ukulele featured on each song.

Each Tuesday for four years from  January 20, 2009 (the date of the inauguration of Barack Obama) to July 31, 2012 (the eve of the London Olympics), TBCOU uploaded a rerecorded version of an original song by The Beatles along with an essay discussing the recording. A ukulele is included in the arrangement of every song. Each song is performed by a different guest artist.

Artists featured include: Samantha Fox, Wang Chung, Nicki Richards, Victoria Vox, Gerald Ross, Jim Boggia, Cynthia Lennon, Elana Hayden, and many unsigned artists. The songs stop at those released by 1970, with no songs that first appeared on Anthology.

"Let It Be" was performed by a gospel choir with samples taken from President Barack Obama's speeches pasted together to form the lyrics of the song.

Song list

References

External links 

Ukuleles
The Beatles tribute albums